Yaroslava Aleksandrovna Bondarenko (born 27 February 1997) is a Russian cyclist. She represented her country at the 2016 Summer Olympics in BMX. She qualified for the final and finished fifth.

References

External links 
 
 
 

1997 births
Living people
BMX riders
Russian female cyclists
Olympic cyclists of Russia
Cyclists at the 2016 Summer Olympics
Cyclists from Moscow